Wadephul is a surname. Notable people with the surname include:

 Johann Wadephul (born 1963), German politician
 Ralf Wadephul (born 1958), German keyboardist and composer